Bathyergus is the genus of dune mole-rats endemic to South Africa.  It contains two species : 

 Namaqua dune mole-rat - B. janetta
 Cape dune mole-rat - B. suillus

References

 
Bathyergidae
Mammals of South Africa
Rodent genera